Cacoceria is a genus of hoverflies.

Species List
C. cressoni (Hull, 1930)
C. willistoni Hull, 1950

References

Diptera of South America
Eristalinae
Hoverfly genera
Taxa named by Frank Montgomery Hull